General MacArthur (IPA pronunciation in Waray-waray: [ˈdʒɛnɛral ˌmɐkˈʔaɾtur]), officially the Municipality of General MacArthur, is a 5th class municipality in the province of Eastern Samar, Philippines. According to the 2020 census, it has a population of 14,411 people.

The town was created from the barrios of Pambujan Sur, Calutan, San Isidro, Vigan, Binalay, Camcueves, Domrog and Pingan of the town of Hernani by virtue of Republic Act No. 193, enacted on June 22, 1947. It was created in honor of General Douglas MacArthur, who was instrumental in the victory of the Battle of Leyte Gulf during World War II.

Barangays
General MacArthur is politically subdivided into 30 barangays.

Demographics

Climate

Economy

References

External links
 [ Philippine Standard Geographic Code]
 Philippine Census Information
 Local Governance Performance Management System 

Municipalities of Eastern Samar